XHCMR-FM is a radio station on 105.3 FM in Cuautla, Morelos, Mexico. It is owned by CapitalMedia and carries its Lokura FM adult hits format.

History
XHCMR received its concession on October 15, 1987. It was owned by Jaime Morales Guillén until his death, at which time the station was transferred to its current concessionaire.

On June 8, 2020, XHCMR was one of seven stations to debut the new Lokura FM adult hits brand, flipping from pop as Capital FM.

References

Radio stations in Morelos